The 1982 Wirral Metropolitan Borough Council election took place on 6 May 1982 to elect members of Wirral Metropolitan Borough Council in England. This election was held on the same day as other local elections.

The second third of the council was up for election to new boundaries.

After the election, the composition of the council was:

Election results

Overall election result

Overall result compared with 1980.

Ward results

Bebington

Bidston

Birkenhead

Bromborough

Clatterbridge

Claughton

Eastham

Egerton

Heswall

Hoylake

Leasowe

Liscard

Moreton

New Brighton

Oxton

Prenton

Royden

Seacombe

Thurstaston

Tranmere

Upton

Wallasey

Notes

• italics denote a sitting councillor • bold denotes the winning candidate

References

1982 English local elections
1982
1980s in Merseyside